Nakhon Chum may refer to:

 Nakhon Chum, Nakhon Thai, a subdistrict in Phitsanulok Province, Thailand
 Nakhon Chum, Mueang Kamphaeng Phet, a subdistrict in Kamphaeng Phet Province, Thailand
 Nakhon Chum, Ban Pong, a subdistrict in Ratchaburi Province, Thailand